Balcon is a surname. Notable people with the surname include: 

Isabella Dal Balcon (born 1977), Italian snowboarder
Jill Balcon (1925–2009), English actress
Michael Balcon (1896–1977), English film producer

See also
Balcom